Oceana (minor planet designation: 224 Oceana) is an asteroid from the asteroid belt. It was discovered by Austrian astronomer Johann Palisa on 30 March 1882, in Vienna. It was named after the Pacific Ocean. Based upon its spectrum, it is classified as an M-type asteroid, but is not metallic.

A light curve generated from photometric observations of this asteroid at Pulkovo Observatory show a rotation period of 9.401 ± 0.001 hours and a brightness variation of 0.09 ± 0.01 in magnitude.

224 Oceana was one of five minor planets included in the 1993 study, Transition Comets -- UV Search for OH Emissions in Asteroids, which was research involving amateur astronomers who were permitted to make use of the Hubble Space Telescope.

References

External links 
 Lightcurve plot of 224 Oceana, Palmer Divide Observatory, B. D. Warner (2006)
 Asteroid Lightcurve Database (LCDB), query form (info )
 Dictionary of Minor Planet Names, Google books
 Asteroids and comets rotation curves, CdR – Observatoire de Genève, Raoul Behrend
 Discovery Circumstances: Numbered Minor Planets (1)-(5000) – Minor Planet Center
 
 

Background asteroids
Oceana
Oceana
M-type asteroids (Tholen)
18820330